The Indie Series Awards (formerly the Indie Soap Awards) is an annual event hosted by We Love Soaps, based in Los Angeles, California, honoring the best in independently produced, scripted entertainment created for the Internet. The ceremony was founded by Roger Newcomb in 2010. In 2013, after the 4th Indie Soap Awards ceremony, the awards were rebranded as the Indie Series Awards.

The awards ceremony was named as one of the 12 "must attend" web series events for creators and fans of online content by Raindance.

History
The award-giving body was established in 2009 by We Love Soaps a Manhattan-based media company boutique that champions serialized entertainment in all forms. In 2011, it became a live event for the first time, hosted by Martha Byrne at the Alvin Ailey American Dance Theater in New York City. The awards ceremony was eventually moved from New York City to Los Angeles in 2014.

Pretty earned a record 13 nominations in December 2011, and Winterthorne tied that record in February 2016. In January 2017, it was announced that the number of nominees for the Best Web Series Drama and Comedy awards would be increased from six to eight in each category. In February 2017, The Bay led with 21 nominations, followed by The Amazing Gayl Pile with 16, both of which broke the previous record of 13 nominations.

Awards ceremonies

Categories

Current categories

Discontinued categories

Special categories
Fan's Choice Award
Special Editor's Awards

References

External links
 Indie Series Awards History and Archive of Past Winners
 We Love Soaps official website